Cha Se-Na (born 15 May 1986, in Seoul) is a South Korean field hockey player. At the 2012 Summer Olympics she competed with the Korea women's national field hockey team in the women's tournament.

References

External links
 

Living people
1986 births
Field hockey players at the 2012 Summer Olympics
Olympic field hockey players of South Korea
South Korean female field hockey players
Field hockey players from Seoul